Mononoke are a type of spirit in Japanese mythology.

Mononoke may also refer to:

 Princess Mononoke, a 1997 Studio Ghibli film
 Mononoke (TV series), a 2007 Japanese anime series
 Mononoke (software), an experimental Mercurial server